The Li Po Chun United World College of Hong Kong (LPCUWC), established in 1992, is an International Baccalaureate boarding school in Wu Kai Sha (烏溪沙), Hong Kong, within walking distance of Wu Kai Sha station. It is the eighth member of the today 18-member United World Colleges movement, and was the first United World College to be founded in Asia.

Li Po Chun United World College of Hong Kong is a subvented school receiving 22 per cent of its funding from the Hong Kong Government's Direct Subsidy Scheme, but commands the highest school fees of all such organisations. According to the Wall Street Journal in late 2007 and the Brown Daily Herald in 2014, the college has top university acceptance rates and is identified as one of the world's top 50 schools for its success in preparing students to enter Ivy League universities, one of only two schools located outside the US, and the only UWC outside the US to make it into the list.

In 2019, the school initiated a solar power system, installing 1,168 panels on campus and will use the revenue generated to provide need-based scholarship for students from grassroots families or developing countries.

History  
Li Po Chun UWC was founded as the first Asian member of the UWC movement. Others having been established in Wales, Canada, Norway, Italy, India, Singapore, Eswatini, United States, Costa Rica, the Netherlands, Bosnia & Herzegovina, Germany, Armenia, China, Thailand, Japan and Tanzania. Patrons of the college and the movement include Nelson Mandela, Her Majesty Queen Noor of Jordan, and the Prince of Wales. The first college, UWC Atlantic College, was established by the German educationalist Kurt Hahn to promote international understanding and peace.

In 1978, Dr Lee Quo-Wei GMB JP, as the Chair of the UWC Hong Kong Selections Committee, was selecting Hong Kong students to study in overseas UWC schools and colleges. He later initiated the idea of building a UWC college in Hong Kong with the help of Mr Li Shiu Tsang MBE JP, who set up the Li Po Chun Charitable Trust. The Trust donated HK$100 million towards the construction of the college, while the Hong Kong government gifted a former mining site in Ma On Shan as the campus. With the support of Sir David Wilson, then Governor of Hong Kong, and the then Principal of UWC Atlantic College, David Sutcliffe, the college was opened on 6 September 1992 by HRH the Prince of Wales. Li Po Chun UWC was one of the first International Baccalaureate schools, and the first international boarding school, in Hong Kong.

Since 2000, UWC graduates have been eligible to participate in the Shelby Davis Scholarship program, the largest international scholarship program for undergraduate studies in the world, which funds UWC students attending leading US universities.

Admissions

Li Po Chun UWC admits students from over 110 countries in addition to students from many local Hong Kong schools. The student body is made up of roughly 42% local and 58% overseas students. In the year 2020–2021, students coming from all 6 inhabited continents represented 90 countries in the world.

Students for all of the United World Colleges are selected by UWC National Committees or selection contacts in over 150 countries on merit, and many receive scholarships. Similar to students from overseas who are selected by the national selection committees of their home countries, local Hong Kong students are chosen by the UWC Hong Kong Committee.

The Hong Kong selection process has 3 rounds. The first short-listing is based on a written application composed of both short and long answer questions about the applicant's extracurricular and community service experience as well as the applicant's academic performance in the past two years, their recommendation form and their interest in UWC. At this stage, students are given the opportunity to rank their top 10 choices of college out of the 18 colleges. The shortlisted group of students is then invited to participate in the school's Challenge Day, a day camp consisting of group activities led by over 100 alumni, teachers and students, usually held in the winter. The final stage of the process is an individual interview with the Principal and a committee composed of an experienced UWC alumni and an external, independent interviewer. Out of the 300 or so Hong Kong students that apply every year, 50 are accepted to Li Po Chun UWC, with an additional 15 sent to other United World Colleges around the world, where they represent Hong Kong.

Academics

Students at the College undertake a 2-year International Baccalaureate Diploma Program. In 2020, Li Po Chun UWC's IB diploma score averages at 36 points, compared to a 31.34 average worldwide. 28% of its graduates  received 40 or more IB Diploma points, compared to the world average of 12.9% One graduate obtained the maximum of 45 points, with two students scoring 44 and six scoring 43.

Li Po Chun UWC offers the following subjects on the IBDP level:

Education Outside the Classroom (EOTC)

Quan Cai 
The CAS (Creativity, Activity, Service) program is one of the three core elements of the International Baccalaureate Diploma Programme. It requires a set number of hours in each of the 3 areas. Li Po Chun UWC's adaptation of this system is called the "Quan Cai" program ("全才" in Chinese, meaning "development of the whole person" ). The program has 4 components, namely community service, creativity, activity, and campus service. A student is required to officially participate in at least 2 Quan Cai per year. The Quan Cai program allows students to start new activities (called an "initiative") at any time, and if successful, the school adopts the activity, making it official. Li Po Chun UWC offers more than 70 Quan Cai activities for students to participate in every year, including Initiative for Peace, Playback Theatre, Coral Monitoring, Lion Dance etc.

Global Issues Forum 
Within the academic timetable, which works on an 8-day cycle, the last block of day 8 is reserved for Global Issues Forum. The entire student body and members of the staff gather to listen to a presentation, given by fellow students, on a global issue, and then participates in an open discussion. Past topics include democracy and censorship, unsustainable fishing, the future of the EU, the impacts of migration and cultural immersion, sexism, the value of education, poverty, fair trade etc.

Cultural Evenings
Cultural evenings aim to promote international understanding and appreciation of diversity. There are six cultural evenings each year, starting with an International Cultural Evening prepared by second years for incoming first years as part of the orientation programme.

The Chinese Cultural Evening takes place every year, while the other evenings, namely the North American Cultural Evening (NACE), Caribbean and Latin American Cultural Evening (CLACE), Middle East, South and Central Asia Cultural Evening (MESCA), Asia-Pacific Evening of Culture (APEC), African Cultural Evening (ACE) and European Cultural Evening (ECE) take place once every two years. In these student-led cultural evenings, students from the same region come together to prepare a week of pre-cultural evening events that highlights their cultural characteristics and a dinner of regional cuisines before the final performance.

China Week
First year students travel to Mainland China in their first term to engage in different community services. Annual China week projects include Teaching English to children of the Yao Tribe in China, visiting an elderly home and helping mentally and physically disabled children in Guangdong province, working with lepers in Yunnan province, working with the Amity Foundation, and Habitat for Humanity. A popular trip involves hiking, cycling, kayaking and rock climbing in the Yangshuo area.

Project Week
Annual project weeks last nine days in March and are for students to lead and work on projects in East, South, and Southeast Asia. Some recent projects have included: Helping rehabilitate a tsunami-struck school in Sri Lanka, performing plays for children in Bangkok, working with children at the Christina Noble Children's Foundation in Ho Chi Minh City and travelling to North Korea to learn about life and affairs in a country that much of the world knows little about, and working in several children's orphanages run by the Happy Tree Organisation in Phnom Penh, Cambodia. Some students also take on other challenging projects during this time such as travelling to Vietnam overland from Hong Kong and human rights evaluations in Philippines. Some students stay in Hong Kong, where there are opportunities to do service locally such as hiking 150km across New Territories without access to technology.

Boarding and Pastoral Care 
All students attending the school, including those from Hong Kong, are required to board. The full student body of approximately 250 students live in 4 residential blocks, sharing rooms of four students, each representing four different nationalities. The entire full time teaching faculty also reside on campus, serving as tutors in addition to their teaching responsibilities. The school is further supported by 2 part time school counselors, 2 school nurses, and second-year students who have been trained in mental health to support their peers.

Graduates
Many graduates enroll in top universities around the world, with most students earning or qualifying for significant scholarships. 46% of Li Po Chun UWC graduates go on to study in the United States, 27% in the United Kingdom, 12% in Hong Kong, 9% in Canada, 5% in Europe and 1% in Asia. Others choose to pursue "3rd year options" which can range from service to traveling, while others go straight into the workforce or return to their home countries for a gap year.

Recent university destinations include Yale University, Columbia University, Cornell University, Wellesley College, University of Oxford, University of Cambridge, Science Po, University of Toronto etc.

Notable alumni 
 Asim Butt  (1978-2010 ) - Painter and sculptor
 Niki Ashton  (1982- ) - Canadian politician
 Dominic Lee (1984- ) - Hong Kong politician
 Elim Chan (1986- ) - Hong Kong music conductor
 Amaya Coppens (1994- ) - Nicaraguan and Belgian woman human rights activist

List of principals
 David Wilkinson (1992-1994)
 Blair Forster (1994-2003)
 Stephen Codrington (2004-2011)
 Arnett Edwards (2011–present)

Controversy 
In May 2018, Li Po Chun UWC announced a HK$50 million donation from Dr. Lee Shau Kee for the development of a Belt and Road Resources Center on campus, scheduled for an opening in Fall 2019. The proposed centre aimed to provide a space for secondary school students across Hong Kong to interact with international students from Belt and Road countries, such as Cambodia, Malaysia, the Philippines and Thailand.

In Dec 2018, students at Li Po Chun UWC launched a petition asking the college to rename the center, fearing that the name Belt and Road Resources Center would compromise the college's political impartiality by siding with China's premier foreign policy. Speculation of the college's political influence stemmed from the open support of Chief Executive Carrie Lam on the college's mission to improve knowledge exchange between Belt and Road countries at the LPCUWC education symposium held in February 2018.

The name of the center has since then been changed to Lee Shau Kee Peace Education Centre, designed by M Moser and Associates.

See also
United World Colleges
International Baccalaureate
Education in Hong Kong

References

External links
Official Website of Li Po Chun United World College
Official Website of the United World Colleges

International schools in Hong Kong
Secondary schools in Hong Kong
Educational institutions established in 1992
Sixth form colleges in Hong Kong
Wu Kai Sha
International Baccalaureate schools in Hong Kong
1992 establishments in Hong Kong
Boarding schools in Hong Kong